Jhikargacha Govt. M. L. Model High School, established in 1888, is one of the oldest schools in Bangladesh. It is a combined secondary school, located in Jhikargachha Upazila, Jessore District.

History
 1888: School established,
 1901: Became Minor School,
 1937: Became High School,
 1939: Recognition received from the University of Calcutta,
 1940: Students first participated in Matriculation,
 1941: The military took over the campus,
 1941: The school was shifted to Misrideara village
 1946: The military left and the old campus was used again,
 1948: School was included in the East Pakistan Secondary Education Board,
 1960: Added new curriculum, Junior scholarship and SSC examination,
 1962: Turned to multilateral education,
 1964: Included in Jessore Education Board.
 1971: Md Abu Daud became headmaster of school
 1976: The school was included in pilot project
 1978: Added new curriculum
 1983: School became multilateral to bilateral
 1983: The school was included community development project
 1994: Firstly a building was built
 2014: Recognised as Model High School
 2018: The School finally became a government school and the name has been changed to Jhikargacha Government M. L. Model High School.

Extracurricular activities 
 BNCC (Bangladesh National Cadet Core)
 Scouting
 Games and sports (mostly cricket and football)
 Debating

References 
1. https://web.archive.org/web/20120224213400/http://www.dshe.gov.bd/search_teacher.php?ins_id=5504011301

High schools in Bangladesh
1888 establishments in India
Schools in Jessore District